James Thomas William Frederick Budden (25 July 1882 – 5 September 1965) was an English cricketer.

Budden represented Hampshire in a single first-class match in 1904 against Oxford University. Budden was not required to bat in the match and bowled twelve wicketless overs.

Budden died at St Denys, Southampton, Hampshire on 5 September 1965.

External links
James Budden at Cricinfo
James Budden at CricketArchive

1882 births
1965 deaths
Cricketers from Southampton
English cricketers
Hampshire cricketers